Eli Wager (February 2, 1926 – April 13, 2003) was an American politician who served in the New York State Assembly from 1966 to 1972.

References

1926 births
2003 deaths
Democratic Party members of the New York State Assembly
20th-century American politicians